Khundab (also Romanized as Khūndāb; also known as Kondāb) is a village in Hoseynabad Rural District, Mehrdasht District, Najafabad County, Isfahan Province, Iran. At the 2006 census, its population was 1,652, in 405 families.

References 

Populated places in Najafabad County